AIDR or As-Is Data Rate is a term primarily used by telephone companies to represent the level of available data throughput that can actually be provided to an end-user over copper wiring.  

AIDR, as opposed to MEDR ("Maximum engineering data rate") is an actual measure of what an end-user can be provided measured in kilobytes per second—in other words, an AIDR of 3000 means that the end user in question can receive up to 3000 kilobytes per second of download speed.

Unlike MEDR, AIDR is dependent upon factors such as distance of the customer's network interface device from the DSLAM (datacenter), whereas MEDR is only a numerical representation of line quality and only includes information on what a line can physically handle—not what can actually be provided to that line.

External links
Cisco Data Network Switches

Telephony